The United States House of Representatives elections in California, 1928 was an election for California's delegation to the United States House of Representatives, which occurred as part of the general election of the House of Representatives on November 6, 1928. California's House delegation remained unchanged at 10 Republicans and 1 Democrat.

Overview

Results
Final results from the Clerk of the House of Representatives:

District 1

District 2

District 3

District 4

District 5

District 6

District 7

District 8

District 9

District 10

District 11

See also
71st United States Congress
Political party strength in California
Political party strength in U.S. states
1928 United States House of Representatives elections

References
California Elections Page
Office of the Clerk of the House of Representatives

External links
California Legislative District Maps (1911-Present)
RAND California Election Returns: District Definitions

1928 California elections
1928
California United States House of Representatives